Neptune Rowing Club, founded in 1908, is located on the River Liffey at Islandbridge, Dublin. It is one of the largest clubs in Ireland, steeped in history and is housed in a new boathouse that was opened in March 2010 by then-President of Ireland Mary McAleese.

The club is a member of the Dublin Metropolitan group of clubs which operates a boat house on the reservoir in Blessington - therefore the club's rowers train at both Islandbridge and Blessington. The Dublin Metropolitan Regatta is also hosted here each year.

Neptune has a strong history in competitive rowing - it has accumulated 152 National Championship titles since 1914, and has won a number of Henley Regatta events including the Diamond Sculls, Britannia 4, Ladies Plate 8, Thames Cup 8 and Prince of Wales 4x (composite with Commercial RC).

Victories at Henley Royal Regatta 
In the 1996 Thames Cup final, Neptune beat Wallingford A.

More recently Neptune had further success at Henley in the Henley Women's Regatta of 2010 with a convincing win for the Elite Pair, beating Oxford University by two lengths in the final.

Honours

Current Membership 

The club currently has a very large and active group of members competing at all levels and across age groups, from novices to internationals competing for Ireland.

A 'Learn To Row' programme is taught at Neptune Rowing Club and participants can graduate from the programme into our competitive Novice Squad. The club also boasts a considerable number of Masters athletes (age 28-70) who compete in Ireland and individuals also represent Ireland at the World Masters Championships.

Championship victories 

All these are Neptune Irish Championships Titles
(152 titles since 1914) 
2016 Men's Novice Quad, Women's Novice Quad 
2010 Women's Senior Pair
2007 Women's Senior Double Scull, Women's Senior 8+ ( composite with Waterford & Muckross )
2006 Men's Junior Scull, Men's Junior Double Scull, Women's Intermediate 8+, Women's Junior Scull and Women's Junior Double Scull
2005 Men's Intermediate 4+, Men's Junior 18 Double Scull, Women's Novice Scull
2004 Seniors: Women's Four
Intermediates: Women's  Eight, Women's Four
Juniors: Men's Scull
2003 Juniors: Men's Quad, Men Pair, Men's Double Scull
Novices: Women's Eight
2002 Juniors: Men's Eight, Men's Four, Men's Pair. Seniors: Men's Quad (composite)
2001 Seniors: Men's Eight, Women Eight, Women's Four, Men's Quad, Men's Single, Men's Coxless Four, Men's Pair, Men's Double Scull, Men's Lightweight Scull
Intermediates: Men's Eight
Juniors: Men's Eight
2000 Seniors: Women's Four, Men's Double Scull
Intermediates: Women's Eight, Women's Single
Juniors: Men's Eight
1999 Seniors: Men's Eight, Men Four, Men Quad, Men Single, Men's coxless Four, Men's Pair
Intermediates: Women's Eight, Women's Four, Men's Single
1998 Seniors: Men's Eight, Men's Four, Men's Single, Men's Coxless Four, Men Pair, Men's Double Scull
Novices: Men's Four
Juniors: Men's Double Scull
1997 Seniors: Men's Eight, Men's Four, Men's Quad, Men's Single, Men's Coxless Four, Men's Pair, Men's Double Scull
Intermediates: Men's Pair, Men's Single
Novices: Men's Eight, Men's Four
1996 Seniors: Men's Eight
Novices: Women's Single
Juniors: Men's Quad, Women's Pair, Women's Double Scull
1995 Seniors: Men's Eight, Men Coxless Four, Men's Pair, Men's Double Scull
1994 Seniors: Men's Coxless Four, Men's Pair
Intermediates: Men's Eight
1993 Seniors: Men's Four, Men's Coxless Four
Novices: Women's Four
Juniors: Men's Single, Men's Double Scull
1992 Seniors: Men Eight, Men's Four, Men coxless Four, Men's Lightweight Scull
Juniors: Men's Double Scull
1991 Seniors: Men's Four, Men's Lightweight Scull
Juniors: Men's Eight
1990 Seniors: Men's Eight
Juniors: Men's Eight
1989 Seniors: Men's Eight, Men's Pair
Juniors: Men's Double Scull
1988 Seniors: Men's Four, Men's Pair
Intermediates: Men's Single
1987 Seniors: Men's Eight, Men's Four, Men Pair
1986 Seniors: Men's Eight, Men's Four, Men Pair
Juniors: Men Pair, Men Double Scull
1985 Seniors: Men's Eight, Men's Four, Men's Pair
Intermediates: Men's Four
1984 Seniors: Men's Eight
1983 Intermediates: Men's Four
1982 Seniors: Men's Pair
Novices: Men's Eight, Men's Four
Juniors: Men's Single, Men's Four, Men's Pair, Men's Double Scull
1981 Seniors: Men's Four
Intermediates: Men's Eight
Juniors: Men's Eight, Men Four, Men's Double Scull
1980 Seniors: Men's Eight
Juniors: Men's Double Scull: Jerome Hurley and John Moloco
1979 Seniors: Men's Double Scull
Juniors: Men's Four, Men's Pair
1977 Intermediates: Men's Eight, Men's Four
Novices: Men's Eight
1976 Juniors: Men's Four
1975 Intermediates: Men's Four
1974 Novices: Men's Eight
1972 Novices: Men's Eight
1971 Intermediates: Men's Eight, Men's Four
1970 Seniors: Men's Eight
1975 Juniors: Men's Single
1963 Intermediates: Men's Four
1947 Novices: Men's Eight
1944 Intermediates: Men's Eight
1934 Seniors: Men's Eight
Intermediates: Men's Eight
1914 Seniors: Men's Eight

References

External links
 Neptune Rowing Club
 Henley Royal Regatta Winners

Rowing clubs in Ireland
Water sports in County Dublin